Éric Caravaca (born 21 November 1966) is a French actor, film director and screenwriter.

The son of an engineer, Caravaca (of Spanish origin) studied literature while taking acting lessons. After obtaining his degree, he left for Paris, where he joined l'École nationale supérieure d'arts et techniques du théâtre, and completed his formation at the Conservatoire national supérieur d'art dramatique. He then went to New York City in 1993, where he studied at the Actors Studio for a year.

Upon his return to France, he began his career in theatre and gained attention in Samuel Beckett's Waiting for Godot. He made his film debut in 1996, in Un samedi sur la terre by Diane Bertrand. He played mostly small roles until C'est quoi la vie?, directed by François Dupeyron in 1999, which earned him the César Award for Most Promising Actor. He worked again with Dupeyron in La chambre des officiers in 2001, and appeared as Luc in Patrice Chéreau's film Son frère in 2003, opposite Bruno Todeschini.

He directed his first film The Passenger in 2005, in which he also played a role (Thomas), opposite Julie Depardieu, which was presented at the Venice Film Festival.

Selected filmography
 1998 - La voie est libre, directed by Stéphane Clavier
 1999 -  Empty Days, directed by Marion Vernoux
 1999 - La vie ne me fait pas peur, directed by Noémie Lvovsky
 1999 - C'est quoi la vie?
 2000 - La parenthèse enchantée, directed by Michel Spinosa
 2001 - The Officers' Ward, directed by François Dupeyron
 2002 - Les amants du Nil, directed by Eric Heumann
 2002 - Novo, directed by Jean-Pierre Limosin
 2003 - Son frère, directed by Patrice Chéreau
 2003 - That Woman, directed by Guillaume Nicloux
 2004 - Inguelezi, directed by François Dupeyron
 2005 - The Passenger
 2006 - La Raison du plus faible, directed by Lucas Belvaux
 2007 - Mon colonel, directed by Laurent Herbiet
 2008 - Cliente, directed by Josiane Balasko
 2009 - Eden à l'ouest , directed by Costas Gavras
 2009 - Une petite zone de turbulences, directed by Alfred Lot
 2010 - La petite chambre, directed by Stéphanie Chuat and Véronique Reymond
 2011 - Chicken with Plums directed by Marjane Satrapi and Vincent Paronnaud
 2015 - Prejudice directed by Antoine Cuypers
 2017 - Back to Burgundy directed by Cédric Klapisch
 2017 - Lover for a Day
 2019 - By the Grace of God directed by François Ozon
 2021 - Everything Went Fine directed by François Ozon

References

External links

1966 births
Living people
Actors from Rennes
French male film actors
French male stage actors
French film directors
Conservatoire de Paris alumni
Most Promising Actor César Award winners
20th-century French male actors
21st-century French male actors
French male screenwriters
French screenwriters
French people of Spanish descent
Mass media people from Rennes